Michaelshaffera beckeri is a species of snout moth in the genus Michaelshaffera. It was described by Solis in 1998, and is known from Brazil.

References

Moths described in 1998
Chrysauginae